"Love Shines" is a song by British-American band Fleetwood Mac. The song was released as a single in 1992 to support the compilation album 25 Years – The Chain. This was the first single released after the departure of vocalist Stevie Nicks and guitarist Rick Vito. The song was released as a single in Europe, but in North America, "Paper Doll" was released instead.

The official music video features the four remaining members playing the song on top of a building in Hollywood. It was the last music video recorded with this lineup.

Track listings
UK 7-inch and cassette single, German 7-inch single
A. "Love Shines" (album version) – 4:48
B. "The Chain" (alternate mix) – 4:20

UK CD single
 "Love Shines" (album version) – 4:48
 "The Chain" (alternate mix) – 4:20
 "Not That Funny" (live version) – 3:21
 "Isn't It Midnight" (alternate version) – 4:02

Personnel
 Christine McVie – keyboards, lead vocals
 Billy Burnette – electric guitar, Dobro, backing vocals
 John McVie – bass guitar
 Mick Fleetwood – drums, tambourine, maracas

Charts

Release history

References

1992 singles
1992 songs
Fleetwood Mac songs
Song recordings produced by Patrick Leonard
Songs written by Christine McVie
Songs written by Eddy Quintela
Warner Records singles